Albert Portas defeated Juan Carlos Ferrero in the final, 4–6, 6–2, 0–6, 7–6(7–5), 7–5 to win the singles tennis title at the 2001 Hamburg European Open.

Gustavo Kuerten was the defending champion, but lost in the first round to Max Mirnyi.

Seeds
A champion seed is indicated in bold text while text in italics indicates the round in which that seed was eliminated.

  Gustavo Kuerten (first round)
  Marat Safin (second round)
  Andre Agassi (second round)
  Pete Sampras (first round)
  Magnus Norman (second round)
  Yevgeny Kafelnikov (first round)
  Lleyton Hewitt (semifinals)
  Juan Carlos Ferrero (final)
  Tim Henman (first round)
  Àlex Corretja (second round)
  Arnaud Clément (first round)
  Sébastien Grosjean (third round)
  Thomas Enqvist (first round)
  Jan-Michael Gambill (third round)
  Dominik Hrbatý (first round)
  Roger Federer (first round)

Draw

Finals

Top half

Section 1

Section 2

Bottom half

Section 3

Section 4

References
 2001 Hamburg Masters Draw

2001 ATP Tour